Blanca of Navarre may refer to:

 Blanca Garcés of Navarre (died 1156), wife of King Sancho III of Castile
 Blanca Sánchez of Navarre, Countess of Champagne (died 1229), also Blanche de Navarre
 Blanche of Navarre (daughter of Theobald I) (1226–1283), daughter of Theobald I of Navarre & wife of John I, Duke of Brittany
 Blanche I of Navarre (1387–1441), Queen of Navarre
 Blanche II of Navarre (1424–1464), Queen of Navarre
 Blanche d'Évreux (1331–1398) also Blanche de Navarre, second wife of Philip VI of France